Carl Schurz Park  is a  public park in the Yorkville neighborhood of Manhattan, New York City, named for German-born Secretary of the Interior Carl Schurz in 1910, at the edge of what was then the solidly German-American community of Yorkville. The park contains Gracie Mansion, the official residence of the Mayor of New York.

Description

Carl Schurz Park overlooks the waters of Hell Gate and Wards Island in the East River, and is the site of Gracie Mansion (built for Archibald Gracie, 1799, enlarged c. 1811), the official residence of the Mayor of New York since 1942. There are tours of the restored building every Wednesday. The park's waterfront promenade is a deck built over the Franklin D. Roosevelt East River Drive, enclosing the roadway except on the side facing the East River. The park is bordered on the west by East End Avenue and on the south by Gracie Square, the extension of East 84th Street to the river. The East River Greenway, part of the Manhattan Waterfront Greenway, passes along the promenade platform.

The park contains winding, shady paths, green lawns, waterfront views, basketball courts, a large playground for children, and two dog runs: one designated for larger dogs and one for smaller dogs. The park is maintained by Carl Schurz Park Conservancy, the oldest park conservancy in New York City, in partnership with the New York City Department of Parks and Recreation.

History
The bluff overlooking a curve in the East River at this point was named by an early owner, Siebert Classen, "Hoorn's Hook", for his native Hoorn on the Zuider Zee. The first house on the site was built for Jacob Walton, a few years before the Revolution, when the picturesque location suddenly gained tactical importance in the control of the East River. In February 1776, the house and grounds were commandeered for an American battery of nine guns on the site. This drew British fire on September 15, 1776, in a mopping-up operation to secure all of Manhattan Island following the Battle of Long Island; the bombardment demolished Walton's house and forced an American withdrawal. The British kept an encampment on the site until Evacuation Day, 1783. Archibald Gracie leveled the remains of the star fort and constructed his timber-framed villa Gracie Mansion in 1799.

The section of the park lying south of 86th Street (set aside as "East River Park" in 1876), where John Jacob Astor once had a villa, was used as a picnic ground when the northern section was acquired by the City of New York in 1891. The easternmost block of 86th Street was acquired subsequently, and the street de-mapped.  A new landscape design by Calvert Vaux and Samuel Parsons was completed in 1902, several years after Vaux's death.

The Park was reconstructed in 1935 by Robert Moses, due to the creation of the FDR Drive, with revised landscaping by Maud Sargent. The Park's restoration from a neglected state in the early 1970s was due to the energies of a neighborhood group, the not-for-profit Carl Schurz Park Conservancy (incorporated 1974), formed originally to clean up the Park's single playground.

Carl Schurz Park served as the location for the climactic fight scene in Spike Lee's 2002 film 25th Hour, starring Edward Norton and Philip Seymour Hoffman.

Notes

References

The WPA Guide to New York City, (1939, 1982; p. 250f)
Frank Bergen Kelley and Edward Hagaman Hall Historical Guide to the City of New York (City History Club of New York) 190, p. 135
http://www.carlschurzparknyc.org/the-history-of-the-conservancy

External links

 Carl Schurz Park Conservancy Official Website
 Carl Schurz Park: Brief History
 Carl Schurz Park: Photos

Parks in Manhattan
Robert Moses projects
Yorkville, Manhattan
East River